Yuan Hanqing (September 7, 1905 – March 2, 1994) was a Chinese chemist, who was a member of the Chinese Academy of Sciences.

References 

1905 births
1994 deaths
Members of the Chinese Academy of Sciences